The 2022 Professional Women's Bowling Association (PWBA) Tour season had a total of 12 title events scheduled in eight locations. These included 8 standard singles title events, three major title events, and one mixed doubles event. While the 2022 schedule had a reduced number of tournaments from 2021, there were more events televised and prize funds increased over previous seasons. All qualifying and match play rounds were broadcast on BowlTV, the PWBA's YouTube channel, as were five final rounds. Seven final rounds were broadcast on CBS Sports Network, including the finals of three major events: USBC Queens, U.S. Women's Open and PWBA Tour Championship.

There were two Classic Series tour stops (versus three in 2021). These included the PWBA Classic Series–Long Island and PWBA Classic Series–Dallas.  The first two tournaments in a Classic Series stop have fully open fields, while the third tournament starts with only the top 24 players in pinfall from the qualifying rounds of the first two tournaments.

Season awards

Player awards
 PWBA Player of the Year: Shannon O'Keefe
 PWBA Rookie of the Year: Olivia Farwell

2022 points leaders
1. Shannon O'Keefe (109,250)
2. Danielle McEwan (101,535)
3. Bryanna Coté (92,902.5)

2022 average leaders
1. Shannon O'Keefe (214.94)
2. Danielle McEwan (213.64)
3. Jordan Richard (212.04)

2022 championship round appearances
1. Shannon O'Keefe (7)
2. Danielle McEwan (6)
3. Bryanna Coté (5)

2021 cashes
T1. Shannon O'Keefe (11)
T1. Jordan Richard (11)
3. Three players tied with 10

Tournament summary

Below is a list of events for the 2022 PWBA Tour season.  Major tournaments are in bold. Career PWBA titles for winners are in parenthesis. All winnings are shown in US dollars.

References

External links
 PWBA.com, home of the Professional Women' Bowling Association

2022 in bowling